Fantastic Beasts is a film series directed by David Yates, and a spin-off prequel to the Harry Potter novel and film series.

Fantastic Beasts may also refer to other parts of the franchise:

Film
 Fantastic Beasts and Where to Find Them (film), a 2016 fantasy film directed by David Yates and written by J. K. Rowling
 Fantastic Beasts: The Crimes of Grindelwald, a 2018 fantasy film directed by David Yates and written by J. K. Rowling
 Fantastic Beasts: The Secrets of Dumbledore, a 2022 fantasy film directed by David Yates and written by J. K. Rowling and Steve Kloves

Music
 Fantastic Beasts and Where to Find Them (soundtrack), the film score to the 2016 film of the same name, composed by James Newton Howard
 Fantastic Beasts: The Crimes of Grindelwald (soundtrack), the film score to the 2018 film of the same name, composed by James Newton Howard
 Fantastic Beasts: The Secrets of Dumbledore (soundtrack), the film score to the 2022 film of the same name, composed by James Newton Howard

Other media
 Fantastic Beasts and Where to Find Them, a 2001 guide book written by J. K. Rowling
 Fantastic Beasts: Cases From the Wizarding World, a 2016 hidden object video game developed by Mediatonic and WB Games San Francisco, and published by Warner Bros. Interactive Entertainment

See also
 Magical creature (disambiguation)